Kenneth Collins may refer to:

 Ken Collins (born 1939), Scottish politician
 Kenneth J. Collins (born 1952), American theologian and minister in the United Methodist Church
 Ken Collins (Kansas politician), member of the Kansas House of Representatives